Mélinée Manouchian (born Melina Assadourian or Soukémian; ; 1913 - 1989) was a French-Armenian résistante and the widow of Missak Manouchian.

Biography
She was born in 1913 in Constantinople as Melina Assadourian (or Soukémian). During the Armenian genocide she lost her parents and was taken, along with her elder sister, to a Protestant orphanage in Smyrne. Then she moved to Corinth, Greece. After 1926 she lived in Marseilles, France, where she learned French and studied accounting. She met her future husband Missak Manouchian in 1934. In 1935 she became secretary of the Armenian Relief Committee. She was in close contact with Charles Aznavour's family. According to Aida Aznavour, the Manouchians "during the long years — and what years! — played an outstanding role in the life of our family". During the French Resistance she became a heroic companion to her husband. She "posed incognito at the scene of a guerilla attack to observe carefully the movements of each actor and note the results of the operation and the reaction of the public". From the early 1940s she regularly made, copied and distributed forbidden anti-fascist literature. When Missak was arrested for the first time, she asked Micha Aznavourian to take her to the camp at Compiègne on his bicycle. She succeeded in passing some food to her husband (prisoner number 351) and even visited him for a second. 

After the last arrest of Missak, she was sentenced to death in absentia, but was hidden and saved by the Aznavourians. After World War II she lived and worked in Yerevan, then in the 1960s she returned to Paris. In 1954 she wrote her memoirs about Missak. 

In her interview in the 1985 documentary Des terroristes à la retraite Manouchian implied strongly that the individuals who betrayed the Manouchian Group could be found in the leadership of the Communist Party of France. In particular, Manouchian accused Boris Holban of being the man responsible for her husband's arrest, claiming that he refused her husband's request to locate the FTP-MOI group out of Paris and threatened to have him shot as a deserter if did leave Paris. The American scholar Brett Bowles noted that Mosco Boucault,, the film's director, went out of his way to portray Manouchian in the most favorable light possible. Bowles noted that in the film: "Visually, Mélinée’s appearance, body language, and the interview site all suggest generosity, candor, and truthfulness. Wearing a brown long sleeve sweater and flowered blouse open at the neck, she sits comfortably in the living room of her modest apartment on an overstuffed chair with legs uncrossed and looks directly into the camera as she speaks, occasionally pumping her hands for emphasis". Furthermore, Boucault shot a series of close-ups of Manouchian's face and was very sympathetic in his questions to her, in marked contrast to the accusatory tone he took in his interview with Holban. She launched a public debate by stating that comrades of the victims had done nothing to prevent their capture and execution.

The last letter

In 1955, on the occasion of the dedication of a street in the 20th arrondissement of Paris named for the Manouchian group, Louis Aragon wrote a poem, "Strophes pour se souvenir", loosely inspired by the last letter that Missak Manouchian wrote to his wife Mélinée:

Mélinée oh my love my orphaned one,
I tell you to live and bear children.

After the execution of Missak, Mélinée never remarried, nor had children.

See also
The Army of Crime

Articles

References

External links
Biography
MISSAK MANOUCHIAN: HIS LAST LETTER
The Red Poster, by Louis Aragon
Livre Mélinée Manouchian "Manouchian" in the catalogue of the national library of France

1913 births
1989 deaths
French people of Armenian descent
Armenians from the Ottoman Empire
French Resistance members
FTP-MOI
Armenian genocide survivors
Affiche Rouge
Emigrants from the Ottoman Empire to Greece
Greek emigrants to France
People from Istanbul